A nonsense word, unlike a sememe, may have no definition. Nonsense words can be classified depending on their orthographic and phonetic similarity with (meaningful) words. If it can be pronounced according to a language's phonotactics, it is a pseudoword. Nonsense words are used in literature for poetic or humorous effect. Proper names of real or fictional entities are sometimes nonsense words.

Nonsense words are also used by researchers and educators as a tool to assess a learner's phonetic decoding ability. The words follow phonetic rules but have no meaning.

A stunt word is a nonsense word used for a special effect, or to attract attention, as part of a performance. Such words are a feature of the work of Dr. Seuss ("Sometimes I am quite certain there's a Jertain in the curtain").

The ability to infer the (hypothetical) meaning of a nonsense word from context is used to test for brain damage.

See also

"Gostak"
"Jabberwocky"
"Runcible"
Meaning (linguistics)
Nonce word
Nonsense syllable
Nonsense verse
Neologism
Vocable
Word salad

References

Nonce words
Language
Humour
Poetic devices
Phonetics
Literature
Nonsense